Regina Edite Camumbila  (born 6 July 1970) is an Angolan handball player.  

She competed at the 2000 Summer Olympics, where Angola placed 9th.

References

External links
 

1970 births
Living people

Angolan female handball players
Olympic handball players of Angola
Handball players at the 2000 Summer Olympics